James Harwood may refer to:

James Taylor Harwood  (1860–1940),  American painter, engraver and art teacher
Jim Harwood (c. 1938–1993), American journalist, film critic, screenwriter, author, and television producer